The 1863 Massachusetts gubernatorial election was held on November 3.

Governor John Albion Andrew was re-elected to a fourth term in office over Democrat Henry W. Paine.

General election

Candidates
John Albion Andrew, Governor of Massachusetts since 1861 (Republican)
Henry W. Paine (Democratic)

Results

See also
 1863 Massachusetts legislature

References

Governor
1863
Massachusetts
November 1863 events